The 1976 Rutgers Scarlet Knights football team represented Rutgers University in the 1976 NCAA Division I football season. In their fourth season under head coach Frank R. Burns, the Scarlet Knights compiled a perfect 11–0 record while competing as an independent, outscored their opponents 287 to 81, and were ranked No. 17 in the final AP Poll. The team's statistical leaders included Bret Kosup with 1,098 passing yards, Glen Kehler with 764 rushing yards, and Mark Twitty with 514 receiving yards.

Schedule

References

Rutgers
Rutgers Scarlet Knights football seasons
College football undefeated seasons
Rutgers Scarlet Knights football